Ushakovsky Bridge ( "Ushakov's Bridge") (previously known as Stroganovsky Bridge ( "Stroganov's Bridge")) is a bridge spanning the Bolshaya Nevka River in Saint Petersburg, Russia named for Admiral Fyodor Ushakov. Originally built in 1786 as a floating pontoon bridge, the bridge was rebuilt between 1847 and 1853 as a multi-span wooden bridge. The bridge was refitted in 1906, 1911, and 1935. The current version of the bridge was constructed between 1953 and 1955. The bridge currently contains 11 spans with the central span being a double-leaf rolling lift. The other spans are bridged over with continuous beams. The bridge's footing is faced with granite.

See also 
 List of bridges in Saint Petersburg

References 

Bridges in Saint Petersburg
Cultural heritage monuments of regional significance in Saint Petersburg
Bridges completed in 1955